, sometimes abbreviated as , is a Japanese rock band from Kita, Tokyo, formed in 1981. It has consisted of vocalist and guitarist Hiroji Miyamoto, guitarist Toshiyuki Ishimori, bassist Seiji Takamidori and drummer Yoshiyuki Tominaga since 1986.

In 2007, Rolling Stone Japan ranked their album The Elephant Kashimashi II number 50 on a list of the greatest Japanese rock albums of all time.

History
Elephant Kashimashi was formed in 1981 by Akabanedai Junior High School classmates Toshiyuki Ishimori and Yoshiyuki Tominaga on guitar and drums respectively. Vocalist and guitarist Hiroji Miyamoto joined in their third year of junior high, and they covered songs by bands such as Deep Purple, Rainbow and RC Succession. They participated in the amateur music competition EastWest put on by Nippon Gakki (Yamaha Corporation) playing original songs. In 1986, Tominaga's high school classmate Seiji Takamidori joined on bass completing the final line up that continues to this day. In December of that year they won the CBS Sony SD audition.

Elephant Kashimashi made their debut on March 21, 1988, with the simultaneous Epic/Sony Records release of the single "Dede" and their self-titled album. Miyamoto, the band's principal songwriter, stated that his biggest influences at the time were Led Zeppelin, The Doors, The Rolling Stones, and T. Rex. Their second album, The Elephant Kashimashi II, followed in November of that same year. The band held a concert at Hibiya Open-Air Concert Hall in 1990 and it has become a tradition, with them having performed there every year since (except 2021). Following several albums with disappointing sales, their contract with Epic/Sony ended after their seventh album Tokyo no Sora in May 1994.

In 1996, Elephant Kashimashi signed with Pony Canyon and released the single "Kanashimi no Hate" in April and the album Kokoro ni Hana wo in August. The album sold well and gave them their first top 10 release on Oricon. Their 1997 album Asu ni Mukatte Hashire -Tsukiyo no Uta- was a big success with half a million copies sold, thanks to the single "Koyoi no Tsuki no Yoni" being used as the theme song of the TV drama Tsuki no Kagayaku Yoru Dakara.

After one more album with Pony Canyon, the band moved to Toshiba EMI in 1999. Reportedly, Elephant Kashimashi's sound at this time was influenced by American hard rock and industrial rock like Nine Inch Nails and Rage Against the Machine. In 2003, the tribute album Elephant Kashimashi Cover Album Hana Otoko was released featuring acts such as Straightener and Takkyu Ishino covering their songs.

In March 2006, Tominaga underwent surgery for a chronic subdural hematoma.

Elephant Kashimashi switched record labels to Universal Music in 2007, and released the single "Oretachi no Ashita" on November 21. The album Starting Over followed on January 30, 2008. "Kizuna", released as a single on March 18, 2009, became the band's first song to be used as the theme of a film when it was selected for Kanshiki Yonezawa Mamoru no Jikenbo. The album Noboreru Taiyō was released on April 29, and its tour ran from May 14 to June 3. 

On September 1, 2012, Miyamoto had acute hearing loss in his left ear and underwent surgery. As a result live activities were suspended for a year until September 14, 2013, when they held a special concert. A second tribute album, Elephant Kashimashi Cover Album 2 ~A Tribute to The Elephant Kashimashi~, featuring bands such as Dragon Ash, The Back Horn, Brahman and 10-Feet was released in 2013.

At the 2018 Space Shower Music Awards, Elephant Kashimashi were given the Best Respect Artist award for their influence and achievements in music. To celebrate the 30th anniversary of their debut, Elephant Kashimashi held their first nationwide tour that covered every prefecture in Japan. It finished with a special concert at Saitama Super Arena where they were supported by Mr. Children and Spitz. Their album Wake Up was released on June 6, 2018, and went on to become a winner at the 11th CD Shop Awards. On November 16, 2018, Akabane Station began playing Elephant Kashimashi songs as departure melodies in hopes to revitalize the area. Three of the band's four members are from Akabane.

2021 marked the first year in 31 years that Elephant Kashimashi did not perform at Hibiya Open-Air Concert Hall. The band is celebrating its 35th anniversary in 2023. They released the single "Yes. I Do" on March 8 and will perform a nine-date arena tour in the spring. On June 9, they will release Elephant Kashimashi Live Archive 2007–2017, a six CD and two Blu-ray set collecting live material previously only included on limited editions of their singles and albums.

Members
 – lead vocals, guitars, primary songwriter
 – guitars
 – bass guitar
 – drums

Discography

Studio albums

Mini-albums

Singles

Limited singles

Compilation albums

Live albums

Tribute albums

Video albums

Awards

References

External links
 Official website
 Elephant Kashimashi at Universal Music
 Elephant Kashimashi at EMI Music
 Elephant Kashimashi at Sony Music

Japanese rock music groups
Japanese alternative rock groups
Universal Music Japan artists
Musical groups from Tokyo
Musical groups established in 1981
1981 establishments in Japan